Michael Medrano is an American singer and songwriter, based in Los Angeles. Having written songs for pop acts like AJ Mitchell ("STOP"), his debut album is expected in 2023.

Personal life
Medrano identifies as openly gay. Speaking to Billboard Magazine, Medrano said, “Sexuality isn’t black and white, it’s a colorful spectrum with a lot of in-betweens that we should be okay with exploring."

Discography

Singles
 "Be There" (2016)
"Heal" (2018)
"Love Somebody Else" (2018)
"Easier" (2019)
"Fluids" (2019)
"No More Tequila" (2019)
"Do Your Thing" (2020)
"Bump This" (2020)
"Hands on You" (2020)
"Sugar" (2021)
"i don't wanna talk about love" (2021)
"Personal Heaven" (2021)
"Naked" (2022)

Albums
LoveSexDrugs (2023)

References

Year of birth missing (living people)
Living people
21st-century American male singers
American male songwriters
American LGBT singers
American LGBT songwriters
American gay musicians
Gay singers
Gay songwriters